Valavanis, with the female form being Valavani is a Greek surname. Notable people with the surname include:

George Valavanis, Greek journalist and writer
Nadia Valavani (born 1954), Greek politician and government minister
Panos Valavanis (born 1954), Greek classical archaeologist
William N. Valavanis (born 1951), American bonsai artist
Jason S. ValaVanis, (born 1964), American author, Certified Financial Planner (CFP)

Greek-language surnames
Surnames